Turtle Creek Township may refer to the following townships in the United States:

 Turtle Creek Township, Shelby County, Ohio
 Turtle Creek Township, Todd County, Minnesota

See also 
 Turtlecreek Township, Warren County, Ohio